Joel Benjamin Werner (born 17 November 1977) is an Australian radio presenter, science journalist and radio producer with ABC Radio National. He is currently the Audio Lead for ABC Science and the host of the Sum of All Parts podcast

Education
Werner attended Newington College from 1983 to 1995 commencing as a preparatory school student in Wyvern House. His undergraduate degree was a B. Psychology (Hons) from the University of Sydney. he then worked as a researcher on projects from sleep disorders, to pharmacy patient behavior, to modeling the future prevalence of dementia in Australia. His second degree was a M. Arts (Journalism) from the University of Technology, Sydney.

Career
He worked in  community radio with 2SER  before starting with the Science Unit at the Australian Broadcasting Corporation.  In 2011 Werner created the show Off Track, which he hosted for two seasons before relocating to the United States. During the last quarter of 2013 he produced and presented a four-part documentary for BBC World Service, Saving The Ocean. The series was broadcast around the globe on World Service, and around Australia on Radio National, in February 2014. In 2014  and 2015 he lived in New York City, where he worked for Radiolab, On The Media, Freakonomics Radio, What's the Point from Nate Silver’s FiveThirtyEight, and 99% Invisible. He won the Best Documentary (Bronze Award) at the Third Coast International Audio Festival 2015. Werner has returned to Australia and is producing The Health Report, Ockham’s Razor, and a digital project that will go to air in late 2016.

Joel produced the ABC astronomy podcast Cosmic Vertigo, and was Executive Producer on Honor Eastly's six part memoir about mental health and suicide, No Feeling Is Final which was selected as the Director’s Choice at the 2019 Third Coast International Audio Festival. He began hosting Sum of All Parts in 2017.

References

1977 births
Living people
ABC radio (Australia) journalists and presenters
Radio in Sydney
Australian soccer coaches
University of Sydney alumni
People educated at Newington College
University of Technology Sydney alumni